FHA-Secure was a Federal Housing Administration refinancing program to help borrowers avoid foreclosure. It is similar to other FHA loan.

FHASecure was a refinancing option that gives homeowners with non-FHA adjustable rate mortgages (ARMs), current or delinquent and regardless of reset status, the ability to refinance into a FHA-insured mortgage.  With FHASecure, the lender will not automatically disqualify you because you are delinquent on your loan, and the lender may offer you a second mortgage to make up the difference between the value of your property and what you owe.

Eligible

So long as you are current on your mortgage and have sufficient income to make the mortgage payment, you are eligible for an FHASecure refinance.  If you are delinquent, the default must have been due to the payment shock of an interest rate reset or, in the case of an Option ARM, the "recasting" of the mortgage to fully amortizing.  

By refinancing into a FHA-insured mortgage, you can expect to pay lower monthly mortgage payments. FHASecure can improve the quality of life for many communities by helping to reduce the number of mortgage defaults and bringing greater stability to local housing markets.

References

Mortgage industry of the United States
Federal assistance in the United States